The economy of the Czech Republic is a developed export-oriented social market economy based in services, manufacturing, and innovation that maintains a high-income welfare state and  the European social model. The Czech Republic participates in the European Single Market as a member of the European Union, and is therefore a part of the economy of the European Union. It uses its own currency, the Czech koruna, instead of the euro. It is a member of the Organisation for Economic Co-operation and Development (OECD). The Czech  Republic ranks 12th in inequality-adjusted human development and 24th in World Bank Human Capital Index, ahead of countries such as the United States, the United Kingdom or France. It was described by The Guardian as "one of Europe’s most flourishing economies".

The industry sector accounts for 37% of the economy, while services account for 61% and agriculture for 2%. The principal industries are high tech engineering, electronics and machine-building, steel production, transportation equipment (automotive, rail and aerospace industry), chemicals, advanced materials and pharmaceuticals. The major services are research and development, ICT and software development, nanotechnology and life sciences. Its main agricultural products are cereals, vegetable oils and hops.

As of 2022, the Czech GDP per capita at purchasing power parity is $46,811 and $28,077 at nominal value. As of September 2021, the unemployment rate in the Czech Republic was the lowest in the EU at 2.6%, and the poverty rate is the second lowest of OECD members, following Denmark. The Czech Republic ranks 21st in the Index of Economic Freedom (ranked behind Chile), 24th in the Global Innovation Index (ranked behind Australia), 32nd in the Global Competitiveness Report, 41st in the ease of doing business index and 25th in the Global Enabling Trade Report (ranked behind Canada). The largest trading partner for both export and import is Germany, followed by other members of the EU. The Czech Republic has a highly diverse economy that ranks 7th in the 2019 Economic Complexity Index.

History

Pre–1989

The Czech lands were among the first industrialized countries in continental Europe during the German Confederation era. The Czech industrial tradition dates back to the 19th century, when the Lands of the Bohemian Crown were the economic and industrial heartland of the Austrian Empire and later the Austrian side of Austria-Hungary. The Czech lands produced a majority (about 70%) of all industrial goods in the Empire, some of which were almost monopolistic. The Czechoslovak crown was introduced in April 1919. Introduced at a 1:1 ratio to the Austro-Hungarian currency, it became one of the most stable currencies in Europe. The First Republic became one of the 10 most developed countries of the world (behind the U.S., Canada, Australia, Switzerland, Argentina, Britain, France, Sweden and Belgium).

The consequences of the 1938 Munich Agreement and subsequent occupation were disastrous for the economy. After the occupation and forced subordination of the economy to German economic interests, the crown was officially pegged to the mark at a ratio of 1:10, even though the unofficial exchange rate was 1 to 6-7 and Germans immediately started buying Czech goods in large quantities.

In accordance with Stalin's development policy of planned interdependence, all the economies of the socialist countries were tightly linked to that of the Soviet Union. Czechoslovakia was the most prosperous country in the Eastern Bloc, however it continued to lag further behind the rest of the developed world. With the disintegration of the communist economic alliance in 1991, Czech manufacturers lost their traditional markets among former communist countries in the east.

Today, this heritage is both an asset and a liability. The Czech Republic has a well-educated population and a densely developed infrastructure.

1989–1995
The "Velvet Revolution" in 1989, offered a chance for profound and sustained political and economic reform. Signs of economic resurgence began to appear in the wake of the shock therapy that the International Monetary Fund (IMF) labelled the "big bang" of January 1991. Since then, consistent liberalization and astute economic management has led to the removal of 95% of all price controls, low unemployment, a positive balance of payments position, a stable exchange rate, a shift of exports from former communist economic bloc markets to Western Europe, and relatively low foreign debt. Inflation has been higher than in some other countries – mostly in the 10% range – and the government has run consistent modest budget deficits.

Two government priorities have been strict fiscal policies and creating a good climate for incoming investment in the republic. Following a series of currency devaluations, the crown has remained stable in relation to the US dollar. The Czech crown became fully convertible for most business purposes in late 1995.

In order to stimulate the economy and attract foreign partners, the government has revamped the legal and administrative structure governing investment. With the breakup of the Soviet Union, the country, till that point highly dependent on exports to the USSR, had to make a radical shift in economic outlook: away from the East, and towards the West. This necessitated the restructuring of existing banking and telecommunications facilities, as well as adjusting commercial laws and practices to fit Western standards. Further minimizing reliance on a single major partner, successive Czech governments have welcomed U.S. investment (amongst others) as a counterbalance to the strong economic influence of Western European partners, especially of their powerful neighbour, Germany.  Although foreign direct investment (FDI) runs in uneven cycles, with a 12.9% share of total FDI between 1990 and March 1998, the U.S. was the third-largest foreign investor in the Czech economy, behind Germany and the Netherlands.

Progress toward creating a stable investment climate was recognized when the Czech Republic became the first post-communist country to receive an investment-grade credit rating by international credit institutions.

The country boasts a flourishing consumer production sector and has privatized most state-owned heavy industries through the voucher privatization system. Under the system, every citizen was given the opportunity to buy, for a moderate price, a book of vouchers that represents potential shares in any state-owned company. The voucher holders could then invest their vouchers, increasing the capital base of the chosen company, and creating a nation of citizen share-holders. This is in contrast to Russian privatization, which consisted of sales of communal assets to private companies rather than share-transfer to citizens. The effect of this policy has been dramatic. Under communism, state ownership of businesses was estimated to be 97%. Privatization through restitution of real estate to the former owners was largely completed in 1992. By 1998, more than 80% of enterprises were in private hands. Now completed, the program has made Czechs, who own shares of each of the Czech companies, one of the highest per-capita share owners in the world.

1995–2000

The country's economic transformation was far from complete. Political and financial crises in 1997 shattered the Czech Republic's image as one of the most stable and prosperous of post-Communist states. Delays in enterprise restructuring and failure to develop a well-functioning capital market played major roles in Czech economic troubles, which culminated in a currency crisis in May. The formerly pegged currency was forced into a floating system as investors sold their Korunas faster than the government could buy them. This followed a worldwide trend to divest from developing countries that year. Investors also worried the republic's economic transformation was far from complete. Another complicating factor was the current account deficit, which reached nearly 8% of GDP.

In response to the crisis, two austerity packages were introduced later in the spring (called vernacularly "The Packages"), which cut government spending by 2.5% of GDP. Growth dropped to 0.3% in 1997, −2.3% in 1998, and −0.5% in 1999. The government established a restructuring agency in 1999 and launched a revitalization program – to spur the sale of firms to foreign companies. Key priorities included accelerating legislative convergence with EU norms, restructuring enterprises, and privatising banks and utilities. The economy, fueled by increased export growth and investment, was expected to recover by 2000.

2000–2005
Growth in 2000–05 was supported by exports to the EU, primarily to Germany, and a strong recovery of foreign and domestic investment. Domestic demand is playing an ever more important role in underpinning growth as interest rates drop and the availability of credit cards and mortgages increases. Current account deficits of around 5% of GDP are beginning to decline as demand for Czech products in the European Union increases. Inflation is under control. Recent accession to the EU gives further impetus and direction to structural reform. In early 2004 the government passed increases in the Value Added Tax (VAT) and tightened eligibility for social benefits with the intention to bring the public finance gap down to 4% of GDP by 2006, but more difficult pension and healthcare reforms will have to wait until after the next elections. Privatization of the state-owned telecommunications firm Český Telecom took place in 2005. Intensified restructuring among large enterprises, improvements in the financial sector, and effective use of available EU funds should strengthen output growth.

2005–2010
Growth continued in the first years of the EU membership. The credit portion of the Financial crisis of 2007–2010 did not affect the Czech Republic much, mostly due to its stable banking sector which has learned its lessons during a smaller crisis in the late 1990s and became much more cautious. As a fraction of the GDP, the Czech public debt is among the smallest ones in Central and Eastern Europe. Moreover, unlike many other post-communist countries, an overwhelming majority of the household debt – over 99% – is denominated in the local Czech currency. That's why the country wasn't affected by the shrunken money supply in the U.S. dollars.

However, as a large exporter, the economy was sensitive to the decrease of the demand in Germany and other trading partners. In the middle of 2009, the annual drop of the GDP for 2009 was estimated around 3% or 4.3%, a relatively modest decrease. The impact of the economic crisis may have been limited by the existence of the national currency that temporarily weakened in H1 of 2009, simplifying the life of the exporters.

2010–2015

From the financial crisis of 2007–2010, Czech Republic is in stagnation or decreasing of GDP. Some commenters and economists criticising fiscally conservative policy of Petr Nečas' right-wing government, especially criticising ex-minister of finance, Miroslav Kalousek. Miroslav Kalousek in a 2008 interview, as minister of finance in the center-right government of Mirek Topolánek, said "Czech Republic will not suffer by financial crisis". In September 2008, Miroslav Kalousek formed state budget with projection of 5% GDP increase in 2009. In 2009 and 2010, Czech Republic suffered strong economical crisis and GDP decreased by 4,5%. From 2009 to 2012, Czech Republic suffered highest state budget deficits in history of independent Czech Republic. From 2008 to 2012, the public debt of Czech Republic increased by 18,9%. Most decrease of industrial output was in construction industry (-25% in 2009, -15,5% in 2013). From 4Q 2009 to 1Q 2013, GDP decreased by 7,8%.

In 2012, Czech government increased VAT. Basic VAT was increased from 20% in 2012 to 21% in 2013 and reduced VAT increased from 14% to 15% in 2013. Small enterprises sales decreased by 21% from 2012 to 2013 as result of increasing VAT. Patria.cz predicting sales stagnation and mild increase in 2013.
Another problem is foreign trade. The Czech Republic is considered an export economy (the Czech Republic has strong machinery and automobile industries), however in 2013, foreign trade rapidly decreased which led to many other problems and increase of state budget deficit. In 2013, Czech National Bank, central bank, implemented controversial monetary step. To increase export and employment, CNB wilfully deflated Czech Crown (CZK), which inflation increased from 0.2% in November 2013, to 1.3% in 1Q 2014.

In 2014, GDP in the Czech Republic increased by 2% and is predicted to increase by 2.7% in 2015. In 2015, Czech Republic's economy grew by 4,2% and it's the fastest growing economy in the European Union. On 29 May 2015, it was announced that growth of the Czech economy has increased from calculated 3,9% to 4,2%.

2015–present

In August 2015, Czech GDP growth was 4.4%, making the Czech economy the highest growing in Europe. On 9 November 2015, unemployment in the Czech Republic was at 5.9%, the lowest number since February 2009. Dividends worth CZK 289 billion were paid to the foreign owners of Czech companies in 2016.

European Union

Since its accession to the European Union in 2004, the Czech Republic has adopted the Economic and Monetary Union of the European Union and it is bound by the Treaty of Accession 2003 to adopt the Euro currency in the future.

The Czech Republic also receives €24.2bn between 2014 and 2020 from the European Structural and Investment Funds, however, this sum does not outweigh the amount of capital outflow of profits of foreign owned firms from the Czech Republic into other EU members, at which the funds are aimed to compensate for.

Public policy

As of 2016, the Czech Republic has the second lowest poverty rate of OECD members only behind Denmark. The Czech healthcare system ranks 13th in the 2016 Euro health consumer index.

Energy

Statistical indicators

Development of main indicators
The following table shows the main economic indicators in 1980–2017. Inflation under 2% is in green.

Background
From the CIA World Factbook 2017
GDP (pp.): $353.9 billion (2016)
GDP (nom.): $195.3 billion (2016)
GDP Growth: 2.6% (2016)
GDP per capita (pp.): $33,500 (2016)
GDP per capita (nom.): $18,487 (2016)
GDP by sector:
Agriculture: 2.5%
Industry: 37.5%
Services: 60% (2016)
Inflation: 0.7% (2016)
Labour Force: 5.427 million (2017)
Unemployment: 2,3% (September 2018)

Industrial production growth rate: 3.5% (2016)

Household income or consumption by percentage share: (2015)
lowest 10%: 4.1%
highest 10%: 21.7%

Public Debt: 34.2% GDP (2018)

Trade and finance

Exports: $136.1 billion
Export goods: machinery and transport equipment, raw materials, fuel, chemicals (2018)

Imports: $122.8 billion
Import goods: machinery and transport equipment, raw materials and fuels, chemicals (2018)
Current Account balance: $2.216 billion (2018)
Export partners: Germany 32.4%, Slovakia 8.4%, Poland 5.8%, UK 5.2%, France 5.2%, Italy 4.3%, Austria 4.2% (2016)
Import partners: Germany 30.6%, Poland 9.6%, China 7.5%, Slovakia 6.3%, Netherlands 5.3%, Italy 4.1% (2016)
Reserves: $85.73 billion (31 December 2016)
Foreign Direct Investment: $139.6 billion (31 December 2016)
Czech Investment Abroad: $43.09 billion (31 December 2016)
External debt: $138 billion (31 December 2016)
Value of Publicly Traded Shares: $44.5 billion (31 December 2016)

Exchange rates:
 koruny (Kč) per US$1 – 21.82 Kč (September 2018), 18.75 (December 2010), 18.277 (2007), 23.957 (2005), 25.7 (2004), 28.2 (2003), 32.7 (2002), 38.0 (2001), 38.6 (2001), 34.6 (1999), 32.3 (1998), 31.7 (1997), 27.1 (1996), 26.5 (1995)
 koruny (Kč) per EUR€1 – 27.33 (May 2015), 25.06 (December 2010)

IT and Telecommunications
Households with access to fixed and mobile telephone access
 landline telephone – 25% (2009)
 according to the Czech Statistical Office: 55,2% (2005); 31,1% (2008); 27,6% (2009); 24,2% (2010); 23,4% (2011); 21,8% (2012)
 mobile telephone – 94% (2009)
 according to the Czech Statistical Office: 81,2% (2005); 92,4% (2008); 94,6% (2009); 95,6% (2010); 96,2% (2011); 97,0% (2012)

Individuals with mobile telephone access
  according to the Czech Statistical Office: 75,8% (2005); 90,6% (2009); 93,9% (2011); 96,0% (2012); 96,0% (2013)

Broadband penetration rate
 fixed broadband – 19.1% (2010)
 mobile broadband – 3.5% (2010)

Individuals using computer and internet
 computer – 67% (2009)
according to the Czech Statistical Office: 42,0% (2005); 59,2% (2009); 64,1% (2010); 67,1% (2011); 69,5% (2012); 70,2% (2013)
 internet – 80.9% (2019)
according to the Czech Statistical Office: 32,1% (2005); 55,9% (2009); 61,8% (2010); 65,5% (2011); 69,5% (2012); 70,4% (2013)

International rankings

Society and quality of life

 27th in Human Development Index (2019)
 13th in inequality-adjusted Human Development Index (2019)
 7th in Henley Passport Index (2019)
 24th in Human Capital Index (2018)
 16th in Quality of Nationality Index (Henley & Partners, 2018)
 27th in Legatum Prosperity Index (2019)
 22th in Social Progress Index (2019)

Macroeconomics 
 41st in Ease of doing business index (2019)
 7th in Economic Complexity Index (2018)
 26th in Global Competitiveness Report (2022)
 25th in Global Enabling Trade Report (2016)
 24th in Global Innovation Index (2019)
 21th in Index of Economic Freedom (2018)

See also

List of Czech regions by GDP
Czech National Bank
 CzechInvest and CzechStartups.org
 International rankings of the Czech Republic
 Prague Stock Exchange
 Tourism in the Czech Republic
 Transport in the Czech Republic

Resources
 Statistická ročenka České republiky (Statistical Yearbook of the Czech Republic) by the Czech Statistical Office. The current line is published annually since 1957. Recent yearbooks can be read online (in Czech and English).
 Czechoslovakia published its first statistical yearbook in 1920. Historically used names: Statistická příručka Republiky československé, Statistická ročenka Protektorátu Čechy a Morava (during the occupation) and Statistická ročenka Československé socialistické republiky.
 Statistics about the Czech lands in Austria-Hungary were collected by Zemský statistický úřad Království českého (Provincial Statistical Office of the Czech Kingdom) founded in 1897. Two detailed books (in Czech and German) were published in 1909 and 1913.
 Benacek, Vladimir: economics of alliances and (dis)integration, an alternative interpretation of transition illustrated on Czech economic history (June 2002) - 25 p.
 Horvath, Julius: the Czech currency crisis of 1997 - En: Dabrovski, Marek: currency crises in emerging markets - New York: Springer, 2003 - p. 221-234
 OECD: economic surveys, Czech republic, 1991-2018 (OECD iLibrary)
 Zidek, Libor: from central planning to the market, the transformation of the Czech economy 1989-2004 Budapest: CEU press, 2017

References

External links
 OECD Economic Survey of the Czech Republic
 Czech economic indicators Latest indicators collected by Czech national bank
 OECD's Czech Republic country Web site
 
 Current economic data
 
 Maldonado, Carlos Gustavo: República checa, transición del socialismo de Estado a la economía de mercado - En: economía de posguerra, blog de historia económica global
 Economy of the Czech Republic – Annual Trends
 World Bank Summary Trade Statistics Czech Republic

 
Czech Republic
Czech Republic
Czech Republic